State Route 354 (SR 354) is a , arc-shaped state highway located entirely within Harris County in the west-central part of the U.S. state of Georgia. It starts out in a north-northeasterly direction and curves to a westerly direction. This highway was built in the early 1960s, on the same alignment as it travels today.

Route description
SR 354 begins at an intersection with SR 116 in Pine Mountain Valley. It continues northward, ascending the Pine Mountain Range. Then, it begins traveling to the north-northeast and enters F. D. Roosevelt State Park prior to meeting Georgia State Route 190 on top of the mountain ridge at a historic bridge built by the Civilian Conservation Corps. It begins to curve to the west and exits the park. SR 354 enters Pine Mountain, where it intersects US 27/SR 1 (Main Street). The route continues to the west until it meets its northern terminus, an intersection with SR 18 west of the town in Champion Crossroad. The route serves as a connector and access road for traffic visiting F. D. Roosevelt State Park.

SR 354 is not part of the National Highway System, a system of roadways important to the nation's economy, defense, and mobility.

History
SR 354 was built, and paved, on its current alignment between 1960 and 1963.

Major intersections

See also

References

External links

 Georgia Roads (Routes 341 - 360)

354
Civilian Conservation Corps in Georgia (U.S. state)
Transportation in Harris County, Georgia